Golden Ocean is the debut full-length album by rock band 50 Foot Wave. It was released in 2005 on Throwing Music.

Track listing
all songs by Rob Ahlers, Bernard Georges and Kristin Hersh

"Long Painting" - 2:57
"Bone China" - 2:29
"Pneuma" - 3:45
"Clara Bow" - 3:10
"Petal" - 4:18
"Dog Days" - 3:52
"Sally Is a Girl" - 4:03
"El Dorado" - 3:15
"Ginger Park" - 2:53
"Diving" - 3:03
"Golden Ocean" - 3:52

Personnel
Kristin Hersh - vocals, guitars
Bernard Georges - bass, vocals
Rob Ahlers - drums, vocals

Production
Producers: Ethan Allen
Engineers: Ethan Allen, James Adam Watts
Mixing: Ethan Allen
Mastering: Joe Gastwirt at Joe's Mastering Joint
Design: Lakuna, Inc.
Photography: David Narcizo and L. Fletcher

References

50 Foot Wave albums
2005 albums